Atlantis The Palm, Dubai is a luxury hotel resort located at the apex of the Palm Jumeirah in the United Arab Emirates. It was the first resort to be built on the island and is themed on the myth of Atlantis but includes distinct Arabian elements. The resort opened on September 24, 2008 as a joint venture between Kerzner International Holdings Limited and Istithmar World.

Hotel
The 1,548 room nautically themed resort has two accommodation wings, consisting of the East and the West Tower, linked together by the Royal Bridge Suite. It is complemented by the Aquaventure water park and the Lost Chambers Aquarium, home to over 65,000 marine animals.

Underwater rooms
The Poseidon and Neptune Underwater Suites at Atlantis The Palm are two of only a tiny handful of underwater hotel rooms around the world, and regularly appear in lists of the world’s most unique accommodation. 

Measuring 165 square meters/1776 square feet in total, the upper, entrance floor is at ground level while the master bedroom and en-suite bathroom are submerged. The almost floor to ceiling windows in both the bedroom and bathroom face out on to the resort’s Ambassador Lagoon, home to a multitude of exotic sea creatures.

Development
Atlantis The Palm, opened on 24 September 2008 as a joint venture between Kerzner International Holdings Limited and Istithmar World. In April 2012, Istithmar World acquired Kerzner's 50-percent stake in the property for US$250 million. The property continues to be managed by Kerzner International Resorts. The architect was design firm Wimberly, Allison, Tong and Goo (WATG) an international firm specializing in Luxury Hotels. The principal contract for the project was awarded to Laing O'Rourke, a multinational construction firm based in United Kingdom. Laing O'Rourke was responsible for the design and construction phases of the 23-story hotel and water park.

Official launch
After the construction of the hotel carried out by Laing O'Rourke it was officially opened on 24 September 2008.

Days before the opening ceremony, the hotel's grand lobby caught fire and became engulfed in flames which caused concern over the hotel's opening. Around the clock work repaired the damage caused and the hotel opened on time.

As part of the opening, a light show of moving images was illuminated onto the hotel. 100,000 fireworks, around seven times the amount that were used for the opening ceremony of the 2008 Beijing Olympics, were let off, lasting 15 minutes. The display of fireworks across the full  stretch of The Palm lit up the entire island and Atlantis, The Palm. Custom-made shells shipped in from across the globe created a light spectacle taking off from the 716 firing locations around the island, including 400 balconies at the resort. Display creator Fireworks by Grucci claims the display set a new world record, but records curator Guinness World Records has yet to announce the status. The launch party costed an estimated £15m in total, with Kylie Minogue earning £2m for a 60-minute performance for the hotel's 2,000 guests.

Dolphin controversy
In October 2007, the hotel received a shipment of 28 bottlenose dolphins from the Solomon Islands, to be used as part of their aquarium exhibit, called Dolphin Bay. The move was decried by several environmental groups, particularly for the fact that the export of dolphins had earlier been banned by the Solomon Islands government (after a similar controversial shipment to Mexico). Hotel managers have said that though the dolphins are being trained to interact with visitors, they will not appear in any sort of show or circus-like performance. They have also stated that the health of the dolphins is paramount; because the bottlenose is not an endangered species, their shipment did not pose a problem. The deal was done with the approval of the United Arab Emirates and Solomon Island governments, through the company Solomon Islands Marine Mammal Education Centre and Exporters Limited (who had overturned the earlier ban in court). The amount of money paid for the dolphins has not been disclosed.

In popular culture
 A task in the sixth leg of The Amazing Race 15 took place at its water park. The 14 team members had to slide down the resort's Leap of Faith water slide, which dropped them along  and  down an 84° incline and through a tunnel beneath the aquarium's shark lagoon. After retrieving the clue at the bottom of the exit pool, teams had to search the water park for Dolphin Bay Beach located near a lagoon, which was the sixth pit stop of the season. However, only 13 team members made it down the slide, as one of the team members, Mika was afraid of heights and water, and she and her partner, Canaan, were eliminated. The water park was visited once again on the eighth leg of The Amazing Race 28. Teams were required to solve a puzzle at an aquarium for the Roadblock. Following that, they had to slide down the Poseidon's Revenge water slide as a miscellaneous task.
 In 2009, an episode of The X Factor was partially filmed at the hotel, with Dannii Minogue using it to choose which female contestants joined her in the live shows.
 In the video game Ace Combat: Assault Horizon, mission 7 takes place in Dubai, in which one can fly through the hotel gates to get an achievement. The achievement will give 10 Gamer score points to the player on Xbox 360 and a bronze trophy on PlayStation 3.
 Bollywood film Happy New Year, directed by Farah Khan starring Shah Rukh Khan, has been shot almost entirely at the Palm. The film also stars Abhishek Bachchan, Deepika Padukone, Boman Irani, Sonu Sood, and Vivaan Shah and released on October 24, 2014.
 In 2016, three season 3 episodes of The Real Housewives of Melbourne were based at the Palm Atlantis, with an Episode 10 visit to the Royal Bridge Suite.
 In 2015, The Real Housewives of Beverly Hills stayed at the Palm Atlantis.
 In 2017 and 2010, Kim Kardashian visited the Royal Bridge Suite, part of her reality show, Keeping Up with the Kardashians. The suite has an average rate of $23,000 a night.
 The 2013 visual novel Kissed by the Baddest Bidder has a hotel based on it.
 In 2020, American rock band Kiss live-streamed its New Year's Eve 2020 Goodbye concert at the Royal Beach and broke two Guinness World Records.

Gallery

See also
Dubai World
Atlantis The Royal, Dubai
List of hotels in Dubai
Atlantis Paradise Island – similar looking hotel by Sol Kerzner

References

External links

2008 establishments in the United Arab Emirates
Aquaria in the United Arab Emirates
Hotel buildings completed in 2008
Palm Jumeirah
Resorts in Dubai
Seaside resorts in the United Arab Emirates
Skyscraper hotels in Dubai